Philip Yates Coleman (July 10, 1931 – July 25, 2021) was a middle- and long-distance runner from the United States. He was born in Champaign, Illinois. He won the gold medal in the men's 3000 metres steeplechase event at the 1959 Pan American Games. Coleman attended Southern Illinois University (1948 - 1952, spent two years in the Army (where he developed as a steeplechaser, teaching himself to hurdle) and becoming inter service steeplechase champion . He attended graduate school at the University of Illinois (1954 – 1964), meanwhile competing for The University of Chicago Track Club. He was a member of the 1956 and 1960 Olympic teams. He retired from running in 1960, wrote an article for Sports Illustrated “Idea of an Amateur, 1962, for which he was awarded the Mohammed Taher trophy by the International Olympic committee.   With his thesis, “Mark Twain’s Desperate Naturalism” completed, he received a PhD in Literature in 1964. He taught literature and served as dean at California University of Pennsylvania, retiring in 1998.

Personal bests
 1500 metres – 3:47.6 (1960)
 Mile – 4:03.8 (1960)
 2 miles – 8:48.0 (1956)
 Steeplechase – 8:40.8 (1958)
 5000 metres – 14:23.1 (1960)

References

External links
 

1931 births
2021 deaths
American male middle-distance runners
American male long-distance runners
American male steeplechase runners
Athletes (track and field) at the 1956 Summer Olympics
Athletes (track and field) at the 1959 Pan American Games
Athletes (track and field) at the 1960 Summer Olympics
Olympic track and field athletes of the United States
Sportspeople from Champaign, Illinois
Track and field athletes from Illinois
Pan American Games gold medalists for the United States
Pan American Games medalists in athletics (track and field)
Medalists at the 1959 Pan American Games
20th-century American people